The 1977 World Taekwondo Championships are the 3rd edition of the World Taekwondo Championships, and were held in Chicago, United States from September 15 to September 17, 1977. A total of 720 athletes and officials from 46 nations took part in the championships.

Medal summary

Medal table

References

WTF Medal Winners

External links
WT Official Website

World Championships
World Taekwondo Championships
World Taekwondo Championships
Taekwondo Championships
Taekwondo competitions in the United States